Faten Ghattas (born 13 October 1964) is a Tunisian swimmer. She competed in four events at the 1984 Summer Olympics.

References

1964 births
Living people
Tunisian female swimmers
Olympic swimmers of Tunisia
Swimmers at the 1984 Summer Olympics
African Games medalists in swimming
African Games gold medalists for Tunisia
African Games silver medalists for Tunisia
Place of birth missing (living people)
Competitors at the 1987 All-Africa Games
20th-century Tunisian women
21st-century Tunisian women